Dayingmen Subdistrict is a subdistrict located on the north of Hexi District, Tianjin, China. It shares border with Dawangzhuang Subdistrict to the northeast, Xiawangfang Subdistrict to the southeast, Taoyuan Subdistrict to the southwest, as well as Xiaobailou and Wudadao Subdistricts to the northwest. As of 2010, its population was 28,358.

The name Dayingmen originated in 1860, when the Qing government established a military garrison here as part of Tianjin's fortification.

History

Administrative divisions 
At the end of 2021, Dayingmen Subdistrict had direct jurisdiction over the following 7 communities:

Gallery

References 

Township-level divisions of Tianjin
Hexi District, Tianjin